Gladys is a female name from the Welsh name Gwladus or Gwladys, which bears the meaning of royalty (princess); conversely, it has been speculated to originally be from the Latin diminutive "gladiolus", meaning small sword hence the gladiolus flowering plant.

It may be used as a Welsh variant of Claudia, meaning lame.

People 

 Berniece Inez Gladys Baker Miracle (1919–2014), American writer and half-sister of actress Marilyn Monroe
 Gladys Adda (1921–1995), Tunisian communist and activist 
 Gladys Aller, American painter
 Gladys Ambrose, English actress
 Gladys Anderson, New Zealand artist
 Gladys Anoma (1930–2006), Ivorian scientist and politician
 Gladys Anslow, American physicist
 Gladys Arnold (1905–2002), Canadian journalist
 Gladys Asmah, Ghanaian politician 
 Gladys Aylward (1902–1970), English missionary to China
 Gladys Elizabeth Baker, American mycologist
 Gladys Pearl Baker (1902–1984), American film editor, mother of actress Marilyn Monroe and writer Berniece Baker Miracle
 Gladys Baldwin (1937–1982), Peruvian sports shooter
 Gladys E. Banks (1897–1972), American politician
 Gladys Beckwith (1929–2020), American women's studies academic
 Gladys Bentley (1907–1960), American blues singer, pianist and entertainer
 Gladys Berejiklian, Australian politician. 45th Premier of New South Wales.
 Gladys Bissonette, Native American tribal leader
 Gladys Black (1909–1998), American ornithologist and writer
 Gladys Blake, American actress
 Gladys Block, American nutritionist
 Gladys Bokese (born 1981), Congolese footballer 
 Gladys Boot (1890–1964), British actress
 Gladys Kamakakuokalani Brandt (1906–2003), educator and civic leader in Hawaii
 Gladys Brandao, Panamanian actress
 Gladys Brockwell, American actress
 Gladys Bustamante (1912–2009), Jamaican activist
 Gladys Calthrop, British scenic designer
 Gladys Cardiff, American author
 Gladys Carmagnola, Paraguayan poet
 Gladys Carrion, American researcher and administrator
 Gladys Hasty Carroll, American fiction writer
 Gladys Campbell, American writer
 Gladys Carson, British swimmer
 Gladys Casely-Hayford (1904–1950), Gold Coast–born Sierra Leonean writer
 Gladys Castelvecchi (1922–  2008), Uruguayan poet
 Gladys Cherry (1881–1965), a survivor of the sinking of the RMS Titanic
 Gladys Colton (1909–1986), English schoolteacher and educationist
 Gladys J. Commons, American government official
 Gladys Cooper, English actress
 Gladys Davis, several people
 Gladys del Estal, killed Basque ecologist activist
 Gladys del Pilar, Swedish singer
 Gladys Dick (1881–1963), American microbiologist
 Gladys Doyle, Papua New Guinea international lawn bowler
 Gladys Egan, American child actress 
 Gladys Ejomi (died 2020), Cameroonian physician
 Gladys Elphick, Australian activist
 Gladys Anderson Emerson (1903–1984), American historian, biochemist and nutritionist
 Gladys Ewart, Canadian pianist
 Gladys Fairbanks (1892–1958), American silent film actress
 Gladys Foster, several people
 Gladys Gale, American singer
 Gladys George (1904–1954), American actress 
 Gladys Gillem (1920–2009), American professional wrestler 
 Gladys Esther Tormes González (born 19 September 1933), Puerto Rican historian
 Gladys Goodall (1908–2015), New Zealand photographer 
 Gladys Guevarra, Filipino actress and comedian 
 Gladys Gunzer, American sculptor 
 Gladys Hall, American journalist 
 Gladys Hansen, American archivist
 Gladys Fries Harriman (1896–1983), American philanthropist, equestrian and big game hunter
 Gladys Heldman (1922–2003), American sports journalist
 Gladys Henson (1897–1982), Irish actress 
 Gladys Hill, screenwriter 
 Gladys Hooper (1903–2016), English supercentenarian
 Gladys Horton, American singer
 Gladys Hulette, American actress
 Gladys Jayawardene (died 1989), Sri Lankan physician and academic
 Gladys Jennings, British actress
 Gladys Johnston, Canadian painter
 Gladys Kahaka, Namibian biochemist
 Gladys Kessler, American judge
 Gladys Kipkemoi, Kenyan runner
 Gladys Kipsoi, Kenyan long-distance runner
 Gladys Knight (born 1944), American singer and actress
 Gladys Landaverde, Salvadoran runner
 Gladys Leslie, American actress
 Gladys Li (born 1948), Hong Kong politician and lawyer
 Gladys Liu, Australian politician
 Gladys Lundwe, Zambian politician
 Gladys Maccabe, British artist
 Gladys Malvern, American actress and writer
 Gladys Marín (1941–2005), Chilean activist and political figure
 Gladys Olebile Masire (1932–2013), Botswana teacher and political figure 
 Gladys McCoy  (1928–1993), American politician
 Gladys Mgudlandlu (1917–1979), South African artist and educator 
 Gladys Midgley, British singer 
 Gladys Milligan, American painter 
 Gladys Mitchell, British writer
 Gladys Moncrieff, Australian singer
 Gladys Morcom (1918–2010), British swimmer
 Gladys Morrell (1888–1969), Bermudian suffragette leader
 Gladys Nasikanda (born 1978), Kenyan volleyball player
 Gladys Nederlander, American theatre producer
 Gladys Nilsson, American artist
 Gladys Nordenstrom, American composer
 Gladys O'Connor, British-Canadian actress
 Gladys Oyenbot, Ugandan actress
 Gladys Milton Palmer, Sarawak princess
 Gladys Parker (1910–1966), American cartoonist
 Gladys Lomafu Pato (born 1930), Swazi short story writer, teacher and lecturer
 Gladys Mills Phipps, American racehorse owner
 Gladys Pidgeon, New Zealand swimmer
 Gladys Pizarro, American music executive
 Gladys María Bejerano Portela (born 1947), Vice President of the Council of State of Cuba
 Gladys Portugues (born 1957), American professional bodybuilder and actress
 Gladys Powers, British centenarian
 Gladys "Patsy" Pulitzer (1928–2011), American model, socialite and philanthropist
 Gladys Pyle, American politician
 Gladys Presley, mother of Elvis Presley
 Gladys Ravenscroft, golfer
 Gladys Reeves (1890–1974), photographer
 Gladys Reichard (1893–1955), American anthropologist and linguist
 Gladys Requena, Venezuelan politician 
 Gladys Reyes (born 1978), Filipina actress
 Gladys Reynell (1881–1956), Australian painter and ceramicist
 Gladys H. Reynolds, American statistician
 Gladys Ripley, British opera singer
 Gladys A. Robinson, American politician 
 Gladys Root (1905–1982), American criminal defense attorney 
 Gladys Rodríguez (born 1943), Puerto Rican actress, comedian, and television host
 Gladys W. Royal, chemist
 Gladys Savary, relief worker
 Gladys Schmitt, American writer
 Gladys Shelley, American composer
 Gladys Skillett, British nurse in World War II
 Gladys Smuckler Moskowitz, singer and composer
 Gladys Spellman (1918–1988), U.S. Congresswoman 
 Gladys Spencer-Churchill, Duchess of Marlborough (1881–1977), French-American aristocrat and socialite
 Gladys Staines (born c. 1951), Christian missionary in India
 Gladys Bronwyn Stern, British writer
 Gladys Eleanor Guggenheim Straus, nutritionist
 Gladys Strum, Canadian politician
 Gladys Swain, French psychiatrist
 Gladys Swarthout, American singer
 Gladys Vanderbilt Széchenyi, American heiress and wife of Count László Széchenyi
 Gladys Taber (1899–1980), American writer
 Gladys Tantaquidgeon, Native American anthropologist
 Gladys Tantoh (born 1975), Cameroonian movie entrepreneur and executive 
 Gladys Taylor, several people
 Gladys Tejeda, Peruvian distance runner
 Gladys Thayer, American painter
 Gladys Triana, Cuban-American artist
 Gladys Triveño, Peruvian lawyer
 Gladys Turquet-Milnes (1887/88–1977), British linguist
 Gladys Buchanan Unger, American writer
 Gladys Vergara, Uruguayan astronomer
 Gladys Chai von der Laage (born 1953), German sports photographer
 Gladys Waddingham, American writer
 Gladys Walton, actress
 Gladys Wamuyu, Kenyan athlete
 Gladys West, mathematician
 Gladys Widdiss, Native American leader
 Gladys Willems, Belgian archer
 Gladys Wynne, Irish painter
 Gladys Yang (1919–1999), Sino-British translator
 Gladys Yelvington, American composer
 Gladys Zender (born 1939), Peruvian model and beauty queen

Fictional characters 

 Gladys, a character in the 2002 monster comedy action film Eight Legged Freaks
 Gladys, a character in the HBO drama The Leftovers
 Gladys, a character on the animated series The Grim Adventures of Billy & Mandy
 Gladys Adams, character in the soap opera Home and Away
 Gladys the Cow, a character on Sesame Street
 Gladys Emmanuel, a character in the BBC comedy Open All Hours
 Gladys Glover, the main character, played by Judy Holliday in the 1954 movie It Should Happen to You
 Gladys Hotchkiss, a character in the musical The Pajama Game
 Gladys Gutzman, a character in the children's book series Junie B. Jones
 Gladys Jones, Jughead and Jellybean's mother on the TV show Riverdale
 Gladys Leeman, a character played by Kristie Alley in the 1999 movie Drop Dead Gorgeous
 Gladys Kravitz, a character in the TV show Bewitched
 Gladys Peterson, a character from the American TV sitcom Get a Life (1990–1992)
 Gladys Porter, a character in the TV sitcom Pete and Gladys
 Gladys Pugh, Chief Yellowcoat, a character in the BBC comedy Hi-de-Hi!
 GLaDOS (real name, Caroline), head of Aperture Science and main antagonist of the video games Portal 1 and 2.

See also 
 GLADIS, a character from the cartoon series Totally Spies!
 Gwladus Ddu (died 1254), Welsh noblewoman, daughter of Llywelyn the Great of Gwynedd
 Gwladys (disambiguation)

References

English feminine given names
Given names
Feminine given names
English given names
Welsh feminine given names